La Bisbal d'Empordà is the county seat of the comarca of Baix Empordà in Catalonia, Spain.
The town lies 29 km southeast of Girona, 12 km west of Palafrugell and 19 km northwest of Palamós along road C-66 from Girona to Palafrugell/Palamós, where it becomes C-31. Two other roads branch off at La Bisbal, GI-660 to Calonge and Sant Feliu de Guíxols and GI-664 to Cassà de la Selva; both roads cross the hilly coastal range called the Gavarres, with many twists and turns. The municipality lies on the northern edge of the Gavarres, on either side of the Daró river-bed, a dry tributary of River Ter.

The town's name is derived from the Catalan word for "bishop", 'bisbe', as the town was owned by the bishops of Girona from the Carolingian period onward. The town is built over the site of a Roman settlement named Fontanetum, and in Old Catalan was sometimes referred to as Fontanet. The 
Spanish name of La Bisbal del Ampurdán is no longer in official use.

The modern settlement can be dated back to no later than the consecration of the church of Santa Maria de la Bisbal in 901 (the current baroque structure dates from the 17th century). The fortified episcopal palace, constructed partially in the Romanesque style, occupies an eminent spot in the historic town center.

The town became home to many French immigrants after the French Revolution of 1789 and saw several skirmishes during the Napoleonic Wars (Peninsular War). In the Battle of La Bisbal, Spanish General Henry O'Donnell defeated the French forces of General François Xavier de Schwarz on 14 September 1810. The town was briefly occupied by Carlist forces in 1874 during the Third Carlist War.

The economy is heavily based on pottery manufacture, as well as agriculture.

The town was served by the  gauge Palamós–Girona–Banyoles railway, which reached a junction with the Barcelona–Cerbère railway at Flaçà by 1887 and was extended to Girona by 1921. Service on the line continued until 1956.

And not least, La Bisbal is one of the traditional centers of the Sardana, the Catalan folk dance.

Geography 
Besides the town of La Bisbal d'Empordà itself, the municipality includes the following populated places:

References 

 Panareda Clopés, Josep Maria; Rios Calvet, Jaume; Rabella Vives, Josep Maria (1989). Guia de Catalunya, Barcelona: Caixa de Catalunya.  (Spanish).  (Catalan).
 Enciclopèdia catalana bàsica (Edn. El Periódico), Barcelona, 1996.

External links
 Government data pages 

Municipalities in Baix Empordà
Populated places in Baix Empordà